The petrosal process is a sharp process below the notch for the passage of the abducent nerve on either side of the dorsum sellae of the sphenoid bone. It articulates with the apex of the petrous portion of the temporal bone, and forms the medial boundary of the foramen lacerum.

References

Bones of the head and neck